Organ Symphony No. 3 may refer to:
 Organ Symphony No. 3 (Vierne)
 Symphony No. 3 (Saint-Saëns) or Organ Symphony